Rose  was launched at Liverpool in 1806. She made one voyage as a slave ship in the triangular trade in enslaved people. Following the abolition of the slave trade new owners sailed her to South America, to New South Wales, and then to the South Seas as a  whaler. While Rose was off Peru the U.S. Navy captured her, but released her. She returned to England and began trading with Savannah. She was last listed in 1823.

Career
Rose first appeared in Lloyd's Register (LR) in 1806 with T.Cubbin, master, Aspinall & Co. owners, and trade Liverpool–Africa.

Enslaving voyage: Captain Thomas Cubbin sailed from Liverpool on 28 June 1806. Rose acquired captives at Bonny and arrived at Kingston, Jamaica on 24 January 1807. There she delivered 346 captives. She left Kingston on 18 March and arrived back at Liverpool on 16 May. She had left with 38 crew members and she suffered four crew deaths on the voyage.

The Slave Trade Act 1807, which forbade British vessels to engage in the slave trade, took effect on 1 May 1807. Rose therefore could not continue in that trade. The Aspinalls sold her to Brook & Co., which employed her in sailing from London to Montevideo, which the British had just captured in February. Captain Charles Penson acquired a letter of marque on 1 September 1807.

The British invasions of the River Plate were short-lived and new owners started sailing Rose on other routes. In 1808 she sailed to Botany Bay. Rose, Brooks, master, arrived at Port Jackson on 15 April 1808 with merchandise from England. She sailed back for England on 15 September. Rose, Pinson, master, arrived at Saint Helena from Botany Bay, and then Plymouth on 15 May 1809. Thereafter, she sailed between London and Cadiz after the onset of the Peninsular War in 1807.

Whaling voyage and capture: Captain Mark Munro acquired a letter of marque on 15 August 1811. On 7 September Rose, Munro, master, sailed from Plymouth for the South Seas.

 captured Rose on 29 April 1813 off Peru. Captain David Porter put the British crews of the vessels he had captured on Rose, made a cartel of her, and sent her for England, but she had to put into Lima leaky. Rose, Munro, master, arrived in England on 3 March 1814.

Citations

 
1806 ships
Liverpool slave ships
Whaling ships
Captured ships
Age of Sail merchant ships of England